Leslie James Heinemann (born January 5, 1955) is an American politician and a Republican member of the South Dakota House of Representatives representing District 8 since January 11, 2013.

Elections
2012 With District 8 incumbent Democratic Representative Mitch Fargen redistricted to District 15 and leaving a seat open, Heinemann ran in the June 5, 2012 Republican Primary; in the four-way November 6, 2012 General election, Democratic nominee Scott Parsley took the first seat and Heinemann took the second seat with 5,262 votes (26.43%) ahead of Democratic nominee Roy Lindsey and fellow Republican nominee Gene Kroger (who had been selected to replace incumbent Representative Patrician Stricherz after she withdrew).

References

External links
Official page at the South Dakota Legislature
Campaign site
 

1955 births
Living people
American dentists
Republican Party members of the South Dakota House of Representatives
People from Flandreau, South Dakota
21st-century American politicians